Heka (Coptic:  hik; also transliterated Hekau) was the deification of magic and medicine in ancient Egypt. The name is the Egyptian word for "magic". According to Egyptian literature (Coffin text, spell 261), Heka existed "before duality had yet come into being." The term ḥk3 was also used to refer to the practice of magical rituals.

Name 
The name Heka is identical with the Egyptian word ḥk3w "magic". This hieroglyphic spelling includes the symbol for the word ka (kꜣ), the ancient Egyptian concept of the vital force.

Beliefs 

The Old Kingdom Pyramid Texts depict Heka as a supernatural energy that the gods possess. The "cannibal pharaoh" must devour other gods to gain this magical power. Eventually, Heka was elevated to a deity in his own right, and a cult devoted to him developed. By the time of the Coffin Texts, Heka is said to have been created at the beginning of time by the creator Atum. Later Heka is depicted as part of the tableau of the divine solar barge as a protector of Osiris capable of blinding crocodiles. Then, during the Ptolemaic dynasty, Heka's role was to proclaim the pharaoh's enthronement as a son of Isis, holding him in his arms.

Heka also appears as part of a divine triad in Esna, capital of the Third Nome, where he is the son of ram-headed Khnum and a succession of goddesses. His mother was alternately said to be Nebetu'u (a form of Hathor), lion-headed Menhit, and the cow goddess Mehetweret, before settling on Neith, a war and mother goddess.

Other deities connected with the force of Heka include Hu, Sia, and Werethekau, whose name means "she who has great magic".

As Egyptologist Ogden Goelet (1994) explains, magic in The Egyptian Book of the Dead is problematic: The text uses various words corresponding to 'magic', for the Egyptians thought magic was a legitimate belief. As Goelet explains:
Heka magic is many things, but, above all, it has a close association with speech and the power of the word. In the realm of Egyptian magic, actions did not necessarily speak louder than words – they were often one and the same thing. Thought, deed, image, and power are theoretically united in the concept of Heka. — O. Goelet (1994)

References

Egyptian gods
Health gods
Magic gods
Medicine deities
Magic (supernatural)

ca:Llista de personatges de la mitologia egípcia#H